Percy Grant is the name of:

 Percy Grant (Royal Navy officer) (1887-1952), Royal Navy admiral and Chief of Navy of the Royal Australian Navy
 Percy Stickney Grant (1860–1927), American Protestant Episcopalian clergyman